William Douglas Spears (August 31, 1906 – December 31, 1992) known as "Bounding Bill Spears" was an American football player and stand-out quarterback for Dan McGugin's Vanderbilt Commodores football teams from 1925 to 1927.  Spears was elected to the College Football Hall of Fame in 1962. Grantland Rice said of Spears that he was one of the fastest quarters he had ever seen.

Early years

High school
Spears attended The McCallie School.

Vanderbilt

Playing years
Known as "Bounding Bill;" "Spears can run a team like a playing coach, drop kick, boot from placement, and pass  and accurately in the teeth of a charging line."

1925
Edwin Pope writes "In 1925 McGugin came up with his finest quarterback in Bill Spears. Spears learned much from his coach and in three seasons had an unbelievably low number of interceptions He led the Commodores three years in which they only lost to Georgia Tech and Auburn in '25, Alabama in '26. and Texas in '27."

1926
The 1926 team suffered its only loss to national champion Alabama.

1927
One fellow wrote Vanderbilt produced "almost certainly the legit top Heisman candidate in Spears, if there had been a Heisman Trophy to award in 1927." In a 32–0 victory over Tulane, Spears had touchdown runs of 88 and 77 yards. Spears received the most votes for the 1927 All-Southern team, and was selected the first-team All-American quarterback by the Associated Press. The 1927 Vanderbilt Commodores included the nation's leading scorer in running back Jimmy Armistead. His understudy at quarterback was later coach Henry "Red" Sanders.

Statistics

Coaching years

1929
Spears was an assistant on the 1929 team.

References

1906 births
1992 deaths
American football drop kickers
American football placekickers
American football quarterbacks
Baseball shortstops
Vanderbilt Commodores baseball players
Vanderbilt Commodores football players
All-American college football players
All-Southern college football players
College Football Hall of Fame inductees
People from Jasper, Tennessee
Players of American football from Tennessee